Abdulla is a 1960 Hindi-language film produced by Amrit Singh. The film is directed by Akkoo, and stars Mahipal and  Shakila in lead roles along with Hiralal, Maruti Rao and Helen. The music was composed by Bulo C Rani. The screenplay is based on a story written by Sheven Rizvi.

Plot 
Abdulla (Mahipal) is a smart and brave young man. With his qualities, he manages to defeat the greatest warrior of the Yemen empire Aquirab (Hiralal). His bravery was awarded with the title of the commander in chief of the Arab empire by the king. Mahipal falls in love with the princess of the empire, Malaque (Shakila). The king loses his eyesight before their marriage. As the commander in chief, Mahipal sets out to bring a precious stone that is believed to cure blindness. Mahipal faces many challenges on his journey to find the precious stone named "Lal Yemen". The moment Mahipal touches the stone, he becomes paralysed, and his appearance becomes grotesque. Ashamed of his body, Mahipal decides to live the rest of his life in the forest alone.
Meanwhile, cruel Aquirab occupies the kingdom. The Princess flees from the palace in search of Mahipal. Later she finds Mahipal, and the kingdom is saved.

Cast 
Mahipal as Abdulla
Shakila as Malaque
Harilal as Aquirab
Maruti Rao
Helen

Soundtrack 
The music was composed by Bulo C. Rani, with lyrics by Sheven Rizvi.

Songs
"Ae Momino Suno Ye Kahani Namaaz Ki" - Mukesh
"Le Le Rab Ka Naam O Gafi" - Mohammed Rafi
"Mange Se Jo Naam Mil Jaati" - Talat Mahmood
"Chan Cham Payal Bole" - Asha Bhosle
"Chand Ka Teeka Pad Gaya Pheeka" - Asha Bhosle
"Khamosh Nazaare Hai Pheeka" - Asha Bhosle
"Mere Aaka Mera Dub Gaya Hai Safina"
"O Guyiya Aate Hi Honge Saiya"

References

External links 
 

1960 films
1960s Hindi-language films
Indian historical action films
Indian historical adventure films
Indian historical drama films
Films set in Yemen
Films set in the Middle East